Mathieu Enguérand Edjekpan Guerin (born 15 January 1985) is a Beninese former professional footballer who played as a defender for lower-league clubs in Italy. In 2001 and 2002 he made two appearances for the Benin national team.

Club career
Edjekpan was born in Porto Novo, Benin. He began his career 2003 in the youth from AS Saint-Étienne. A year later, he moved to Italy.

Edjekpan began now his professional career with Urbino playing 28 of 34 matches in the 2004–05 season. He signed for Grottaglie in July 2005 where he made 50 appearances scoring two goals before joining to Mesagne  in summer 2007.

International career
According to National Football Teams, Edjekpan is the youngest ever international footballer. Their records say that he played in a 2–0 loss to Angola in August 1998. He would have been 13 years and 213 days old at the time of his debut. However, RSSSF dispute the verifiability of this. He was called up again after a six-year absence for Benin in 2008.

References

External links
 

1985 births
Living people
People from Porto-Novo
Beninese footballers
Association football defenders
Benin international footballers
Beninese expatriate footballers
Beninese expatriate sportspeople in Italy
Expatriate footballers in Italy
Beninese expatriate sportspeople in France
Expatriate footballers in France